Zakomara is a semicircular or keeled completion of a wall (curtain wall) in the Old Russian architecture, reproducing the adjacent to the inner cylindrical (convex, crossed) vault.
 
False zakomar, which is not repeating the inner shapes of the vault, is called the kokoshnik. Kokoshniks were only made as exterior decorative elements. They were placed on the walls, vaults, as well as the shrinking tiers at the base of the tents and reels of chapters in Church buildings.

History
In the XII-XVII centuries, zakomars were a typical detail in the ancient Russian Orthodox temple architecture. Quite often, a combination of zakomars and kokoshniks was used in the construction of many temples.

The roof in the zakomar covering was arranged directly on the vaults. Depending on the number of vaults, the facade of the Church had the same amount of zakomars. By the XVII century, a significant number of Russian temples had the zakomar covering. But sophisticated curvilinear rooftop was not very practical—the snow and rain accumulated on it, causing leaks. By the end of the XVII century, the Baroque era came to the Russian architecture, making the zakomars and zakomar coverings a thing of the past. In the XVIII-XIX centuries, zakomar coverings were replaced with four-pitched roofs in many temples. Because of the spread of the retrospective trends in the Russian Empire’s architecture, zakomars reappeared in the Church buildings.

At the end of the XX century, the revival of the zakomar covering has occurred. It was due to the appearance of construction technology, which created rain and snow resistant zakomar coverings. Therefore, the new Uspensky Cathedral in Yaroslavl has the zakomar covering.

Examples

References

Architecture in Russia
Church architecture
Russian inventions
Architectural elements